{{DISPLAYTITLE:M1G}}

M1G (pyrimido[1,2-a]purin-10(3H)-one) is a heterocyclic compound which is a by-product of base excision repair (BER) of a specific type of DNA adduct called M1dG. The M1dG adduct in turn is formed by a condensation reaction between guanosine nucleotides in DNA and either malondialdehyde (propanedial)  or acrolein. If not repaired, these adducts are mutagenic and carcinogenic.

Malondialdehyde is an end product of lipid peroxidation while acrolein is a result of DNA peroxidation.

M1dG is the major endogenous DNA adduct in humans. M1dG adducts have been detected in cell DNA in liver, leucocytes, pancreas and breast in concentrations of 1-120 per 108 nucleotides. Detection and quantification of M1dG adducts in the body as measured by free M1G is a tool for detecting DNA damage that may lead to cancer. Free M1G is also biomarker for oxidative stress.

References

External links
 
 

Biochemistry
Carcinogenesis
Purines